Móricz Zsigmond körtér is a station of Line 4 of the Budapest Metro. It is located beneath the eponymous square, and is a major public transport hub in Buda along with Széll Kálmán tér. It is also the southern terminus of Tramline 6. The station was opened on 28 March 2014 as part of the inaugural section of the line, from Keleti pályaudvar to Kelenföld vasútállomás.

Connections
Bus: 7, 27, 33, 58, 114, 213, 214, 240
Tram: 6, 17, 19, 41, 47, 48, 49, 56, 56A, 61

References

Official web page of the construction

M4 (Budapest Metro) stations
Railway stations opened in 2014
2014 establishments in Hungary